A Member of State Council (MSC) is a term used for an individual who has, by election or appointment, been a member of a State Council, a legislature of many nations and colonies.

Parliamentary titles